Elaphoglossum crassifolium is a species of fern in the family Dryopteridaceae.

References

Dryopteridaceae